Roger Dumas (9 May 1932 – 2 July 2016) was a French film actor. He appeared in more than 100 films between 1954 and 2016. He was born in Annonay, Ardèche.

Selected filmography

 Wild Fruit (1954) - Hans
 Before the Deluge (1954) - Un élève (uncredited)
 Les premiers outrages (1955) - Jojo - l'employé de l'auberge
 Maid in Paris (1956) - Un jeune dragueur au jardin
 If All the Guys in the World (1956) - Jean-Pierre
 Pardonnez nos offenses (1956)
 Les promesses dangereuses (1956) - La Bourride
 The Bride Is Much Too Beautiful (1956) - Marc
 Isabelle Is Afraid of Men (1957) - Maxime Brissac
 Mimi Pinson (1958) - Pierrot
 Asphalte (1959) - Marcel
 Rue des prairies (1959) - Fernand Neveux
 Signé Arsène Lupin (1959) - Isidore Bautrelet dit Véritaz
 Carillons sans joie (1962) - Adolphe Charlier, dit 'le môme'
 Cross of the Living (1962) - Sylvain
 The Deadly Decoy (1962) - Louis
 Pouic-Pouic (1963) - Paul Monestier
 That Man from Rio (1964) - Lebel, Dufourquet's Buddy
 La chance et l'amour (1964) - Taupin (segment "Chance du guerrier, La")
 Le Tigre aime la chair fraiche (1964) - Duvet
 Our Agent Tiger (1965) - Duvet
 La Ligne de démarcation (1966) - Chéti, le passeur / Passer
 Darling Caroline (1968) - Clément, l'ancien jardinier du comte
 Bruno, l'enfant du dimanche (1969) - Jean-Claude
 Du blé en liasses (1969) - Faubst
 Dédé la tendresse (1974)
 La Rage au poing (1975) - Le voisin
 Le bougnoul (1975) - Jeannot
 Le faux-cul (1975) - Frémicourt
 Un tueur, un flic, ainsi soit-il... (1977) - Michaud
 Tendre Poulet (1977) - Marcel Guérin, l'inspecteur
 Général... nous voilà! (1978) - Bazas
 Le Marginal (1983) - Inspecteur Simon
 Fort Saganne (1984) - Vulpi
 The Public Woman (1984) - André, le photographe
 L'amour en douce (1985) - Georges
 Suivez mon regard (1986) - L'homme au pouce cassé
 Le débutant (1986) - Marceau
 Masks (1987) - Manu
 Association of Wrongdoers (1987) - Superintendent Brunet
 Chouans! (1988) - Bouchard
 Les Années sandwiches (1988) - L'homme au chien
 Bunker Palace Hôtel (1989) - Zarka
 A Tale of Winter (1992) - Léontès
 Loulou Graffiti (1992) - De mirmont
 Pétain (1993) - Bonhomme
 A New Life (1993) - Martin
 New World (1995) - The Priest
 Tykho Moon (1996) - Patron
 Soleil (1997) - Mr. Muraton
 The Visitors II: The Corridors of Time (1998) - Maître Valoche
 Sentimental Destinies (2000) - Pauline's boss
 Inch'Allah Dimanche (2001) - Monsieur Donze
 Le Cri (2006, TV Mini-Series) - Le chef comptable
 Comedy of Power (2006) - René Lange
 Le Grand Meaulnes (2006) - L'horloger
 Hunting and Gathering (2007) - Le patron du 'restaurant des voyageurs'
 I Always Wanted to Be a Gangster (2007) - Pierrot la Pince
 Ca$h (2008) - Emile
 The First Day of the Rest of Your Life (2008) - Pierre
 Bank Error in Your Favour (2009) - Lebrun
 La différence, c'est que c'est pas pareil (2009) - Pierrot la Pince
 Le concert (2009) - Momo
 Dumas (2010) - M. de Saint Omer
 Derrière les murs (2011) - Père Francis
 Zarafa (2012) - Charles X (voice)
 Premiers crus (2015) - Grand-Jacques

References

External links

1932 births
2016 deaths
People from Annonay
French male film actors
20th-century French male actors
21st-century French male actors
French lyricists